Van Orden v. Perry, 545 U.S. 677 (2005), was a United States Supreme Court case involving whether a display of the Ten Commandments on a monument given to the government at the Texas State Capitol in Austin violated the Establishment Clause of the First Amendment.

In a suit brought by Thomas Van Orden of Austin, the United States Court of Appeals for the Fifth Circuit ruled in November 2003 that the displays were constitutional, on the grounds that the monument conveyed both a religious and secular message. Van Orden appealed, and in October 2004 the high court agreed to hear the case at the same time as it heard McCreary County v. ACLU of Kentucky, a similar case challenging a display of the Ten Commandments at two county courthouses in Kentucky.

The appeal of the 5th Circuit's decision was argued by Erwin Chemerinsky, a constitutional law scholar and the Alston & Bird Professor of Law at Duke University School of Law, who represented Van Orden on a pro bono basis. Texas' case was argued by Texas Attorney General Greg Abbott.  An amicus curiae was presented on behalf of the respondents (the state of Texas) by then-Solicitor General Paul Clement.

The Supreme Court ruled on June 27, 2005, by a vote of 5 to 4, that the display was constitutional. The Court chose not to employ the popular Lemon test in its analysis, reasoning that the display at issue was a "passive monument."  Instead, the Court looked to "the nature of the monument and ... our Nation's history."  Chief Justice William Rehnquist delivered the plurality opinion of the Court; Justice Stephen Breyer concurred in the judgment but wrote separately. The similar case of McCreary County v. ACLU of Kentucky was handed down the same day with the opposite result (also with a 5 to 4 decision). The "swing vote" in both cases was Breyer.

Background 

The monument under challenge was 6-feet high and 3-feet wide which was installed in 1961. It was donated to the State of Texas by the Fraternal Order of Eagles, a civic organization, which had received the support of Cecil B. DeMille, who had directed the film The Ten Commandments (1956). The State accepted the monument and selected a site for it based on the recommendation of the state agency responsible for maintaining the Capitol grounds. The donating organization paid for its erection. Two state legislators presided over the dedication of the monument.

The monument was erected on the Capitol grounds, behind the capitol building (between the Texas Capitol and Supreme Court buildings). The surrounding 22 acres (89,000 m2) contained 17 monuments and 21 historical markers commemorating the "people, ideals, and events that compose Texan identity."

Plurality opinion
The plurality opinion stated that the monument was constitutional, as it represented historical value and not purely religious value. The primary content is the text of the Ten Commandments. An eagle grasping the American flag, an Eye of Providence, and two small tablets with what appears to be an ancient script are carved above the text of the Ten Commandments. Below the text are two Stars of David and the superimposed Greek letters Chi and Rho, which represent Christ. The bottom of the monument bears the inscription in capitals "Presented to the People and Youth of Texas by The Fraternal Order of Eagles of Texas 1961."

Below the above matter, and the title "the Ten Commandments", the monument's text reads in full:
I AM the LORD thy God.
Thou shalt have no other gods before me.
Thou shalt not make to thyself any graven images.
Thou shalt not take the Name of the Lord thy God in vain.
Remember the Sabbath day, to keep it holy.
Honor thy father and thy mother, that thy days may be long upon the land which the Lord thy God giveth thee.
Thou shalt not kill.
Thou shalt not commit adultery.
Thou shalt not steal.
Thou shalt not bear false witness against thy neighbor.
Thou shalt not covet thy neighbor's house.
Thou shalt not covet thy neighbor's wife, nor his manservant, nor his maidservant, nor his cattle, nor anything that is thy neighbor's.

Thomas Van Orden challenged the constitutionality of the monument. A native Texan, Van Orden passed by the monument frequently when he would go to the Texas Supreme Court building to use its law library.

Breyer's concurrence 

Breyer's concurrence in this case is made all the more interesting because on the surface it appears that he voted quite differently in McCreary County v. ACLU of Kentucky, a case which was heard and decided at the same time and seems, to the casual observer, virtually identical.  However, in Van Orden v. Perry, Breyer submitted an opinion separate from that of the Court, while in McCreary he did not.  As a result, the Van Orden case was decided by a plurality, not a majority as the other.

In opening his discussion of reasoning Breyer states:

He then goes on to list points which are stated to be insufficient individually, but together seem to provide a reasonable basis for "secular purpose":

Breyer then goes on to state:

Breyer continues to explain a position which seeks to balance between not "lead[ing] the law to exhibit a hostility toward religion that has no place in our Establishment Clause of the First Amendment traditions" and "recogniz[ing] the danger of the slippery slope" and ultimately rests upon a "matter of degree [which] is, I believe, critical in a borderline case such as this one."

Breyer concludes by stating he cannot agree with the plurality, nor with Justice Scalia's dissent in McCreary County v. ACLU of Kentucky, but while he does agree with Justice O'Connor's statement of principles in McCreary, he disagrees with her evaluation of the evidence as it bears on the applying those principles to Van Orden v. Perry.

Stevens' dissent 

Stevens' dissenting opinion essentially stated that, in formulating a ruling for this case, the court had to consider whether the display had any significant relation to the specific and secular history of the state of Texas or the United States as a whole. Ultimately, Stevens asserted that the display "has no purported connection to God's role in the formation of Texas or the founding of our Nation" and therefore could not be protected on the basis that it was a display dealing with secular ideals. In fact, Stevens says that the display transmits the message that Texas specifically endorses the Judeo-Christian values of the display and thus violates the establishment clause.

See also 
 List of United States Supreme Court cases, volume 545
 Stone v. Graham (1980)
 Glassroth v. Moore (11th Cir. 2003)
 McCreary County v. American Civil Liberties Union (2005)
 Pleasant Grove City v. Summum (2009)
 Green v. Haskell County Board of Commissioners (10th Cir. 2009)

References

Sources 
 Van Orden v. Perry, oral arguments and opinions on Oyez.org
 [ U.S. Supreme Court docket for 03-1500 Van Orden v. Perry]
 Van Orden v. Perry First Amendment Center online library (archived)
 Supreme Court on a Shoestring, Sylvia Moreno, The Washington Post, February 21, 2005
 Supreme Court splits on Ten Commandments, Warren Richey, Christian Science Monitor, June 28, 2005

External links 
 Religion & Ethics Newsweekly (PBS), includes video coverage

United States Supreme Court cases
Establishment Clause case law
Ten Commandments
United States Supreme Court cases of the Rehnquist Court
2005 in United States case law
2005 in religion
United States lawsuits
History of Austin, Texas
Rick Perry
Legal history of Texas